Highland Peak is a prominent 10,936-foot-elevation (3,333 meter) mountain summit located in the Sierra Nevada mountain range, in Alpine County of northern California, United States. It is situated 3.5 miles east of Ebbetts Pass in the Carson-Iceberg Wilderness, on land managed by Humboldt–Toiyabe National Forest. Although it ranks as the 680th highest summit in California, it ranks 36th highest of those with at least 500 meters of topographic prominence. Also, there is no higher peak than Highland Peak to the north within the Sierra Nevada. Highland Peak has a subsidiary South Peak (10,824 ft/3,299 m), with one-half mile separation between summits. The Pacific Crest Trail traverses the western foot of this mountain, providing an approach option.

History

This mountain's name was applied in 1878 by Lieutenant Montgomery M. Macomb during the Wheeler Survey. The name commemorates the short-lived Highland City, set on the high land between the Carson and Stanislaus watersheds. The mountain's name has been officially adopted by the United States Board on Geographic Names, and a brass USGS benchmark bearing the name was placed at the summit in 1956.

Climate
According to the Köppen climate classification system, Highland Peak is located in an alpine climate zone. Most weather fronts originate in the Pacific Ocean, and travel east toward the Sierra Nevada mountains. As fronts approach, they are forced upward by the peaks, causing them to drop their moisture in the form of rain or snowfall onto the range (orographic lift). Precipitation runoff from this mountain drains into tributaries of the East Fork Carson River.

See also

 List of the major 3000-meter summits of California
 List of mountain peaks of California

Gallery

References

External links
 Weather forecast: Highland Peak

Mountains of Alpine County, California
North American 3000 m summits
Mountains of Northern California
Sierra Nevada (United States)
Humboldt–Toiyabe National Forest